Selah is a Hebrew word meaning "pause, reflection", within the context of a prayer or psalms.

Selah may also refer to:

Music
 Selah (band), a contemporary Christian trio
 "Selah" (Kanye West song) (2019)
 "Selah", a song by P.O.D. from Brown
 "Selah", a song by Emeli Sandé from Long Live the Angels
 "Selah", a song by Phinehas from Fight Through the Night

People
 Selah Marley, American fashion model and singer.
 Selah Sue, Belgian singer and songwriter

Other
 Selah, Washington, a town in Washington, U.S.
 Selah, Hebrew abbreviation for "Students before Parents", an Israeli immigration program for Jewish youth 
 Selah, the protagonist in Selah and the Spades, a 2019 American film
 Selaa, village in Lebanon

See also

 Salat, an Islamic prayer to Allah
 Sela (disambiguation)